Imera is short for I Imera, a Greek newspaper.

Imera may also refer to:
 Imera, Kozani
 Imera, Xanthi
 Imera (company), an Irish company

See also
 Imera Meridionale or Salso, a river in Sicily